Lebanese people in Spain are people from Lebanon or those of Lebanese descent, who live in the country of Spain. Most of the Lebanese people in Spain are expatriates from Lebanon but also there is a sizable group of people with Lebanese descent from Latin American countries with sizable Lebanese diasporas like Argentina, Colombia, Ecuador, Venezuela, Mexico, Uruguay, Chile, Paraguay and Brazil.

Notable people

 Miguel Casiri
 Yamila Diaz
 Noel Jammal
 José María Benegas
 Roberto Merhi
 Shakira
 Chenoa

See also
 Lebanon–Spain relations
 List of Lebanese people in Spain
 Arabs in Spain
 Arabs in Europe
 Lebanese diaspora

References

Spain
Spanish people of Lebanese descent